Paul Desmond Swain  (born 20 December 1951) is a New Zealand former politician. He is a member of the Labour Party.

Early life
Swain was born in Palmerston North on 20 December 1951. He attended St. Patrick's College in Wellington. He has obtained a BA from Victoria University of Wellington. Swain has two daughters and a son with his wife Toni Reeves-Swain, and two sons from an earlier marriage.

Before entering politics, he worked for the Ministry of Social Development from 1975 to 1976 before becoming a bus driver for the Wellington City Council in 1976. He then changed professions again working as a teacher from 1978 to 1982. In 1987 he became a research officer for the New Zealand Federation of Labour (later Council of Trade Unions) until 1990 when he was elected to parliament.

He was the employee coordinator for the Wellington YMCA from 1982 to 1986 and was also chairman of the Wellington Regional Employment and ACCESS Council. At the 1986 local elections he stood for the Wellington Regional Council on the Labour Party ticket. He polled well but did not win a seat.

Member of Parliament

He was MP for the seat of Eastern Hutt from the 1990 election until the 1996 election, when the electorate boundaries were changed and it became Rimutaka. He won Rimutaka in 1996 and held the seat until the 2008 election, which he did not contest, retiring from national politics.

In November 1990 he was appointed as Labour's spokesperson for Forestry by Labour leader Mike Moore. In a December 1991 reshuffle Swain was given the Housing portfolio as well. He supported Helen Clark's successful leadership challenge against Moore in 1993. He retained housing and lost forestry, but later also became spokesperson for accident compensation between 1993 and 1996. From 1996 to 1999 Swain was Shadow Minister of Commerce and State Owned Enterprises.

Minister
Swain has held a number of ministerial portfolios, including Associate Minister of Finance, Minister of Commerce, Minister of Communications, Minister of Corrections, Minister of Immigration, Minister for Information Technology, Minister of Labour, Minister of Statistics, Minister for State Owned Enterprises, Minister of Transport, and Associate Minister for Economic Development.

After the 2005 election, Swain decided not to seek a Cabinet post in the new government.

Life after politics
In the 2009 New Year Honours, Swain was appointed a Companion of the Queen's Service Order, for services as a Member of Parliament.

In 2009, he was employed by the Crown as their lead negotiator for a settlement of historical grievances with Ngāti Porou.

In 2016, he became chairman of the New Zealand Fire Service; now Fire and Emergency New Zealand.

In July 2019 Swain announced that he would not be standing for re-election to the Wellington Regional Council, on which he has been a councillor since 2010.

References

|-

|-

|-

|-

1951 births
Living people
Members of the Cabinet of New Zealand
New Zealand MPs for Hutt Valley electorates
Members of the New Zealand House of Representatives
New Zealand Labour Party MPs
People from Palmerston North
People educated at St. Patrick's College, Wellington
Victoria University of Wellington alumni
Companions of the Queen's Service Order
Wellington regional councillors
21st-century New Zealand politicians